The Rottal Hut (German: Rottalhütte) is a mountain hut of the Swiss Alpine Club, located south of Lauterbrunnen in the canton of Bern. It lies at a height of 2,755 metres above sea level, above the Rottal Glacier on the western slopes of the Jungfrau.

The shortest access is from Stechelberg or Trachsellauenen.

References
Swisstopo topographic maps

External links
Official website

Mountain huts in Switzerland
Buildings and structures in the canton of Bern
Mountain huts in the Alps